The following highways are numbered 359:

Canada
Manitoba Provincial Road 359
 Nova Scotia Route 359
 Quebec Route 359

Japan
 Japan National Route 359

United States
  Interstate 359
  Arkansas Highway 359
  Georgia State Route 359 (former)
  Maryland Route 359
 Maryland Route 359
  Nevada State Route 359
 New York:
  New York State Route 359
 New York State Route 359 (former)
 County Route 359 (Albany County, New York)
  Puerto Rico Highway 359
 Texas:
  Texas State Highway 359
  Farm to Market Road 359
  Virginia State Route 359